Hatamabad (also Romanized as Ḩātamābād) is a village in Firuzabad Rural District, Firuzabad District, Selseleh County, Lorestan Province, Iran. At the 2006 census, its population was 224, in 49 families.

References 

Towns and villages in Selseleh County